The first season of the reality television series Love & Hip Hop: New York aired on VH1 from March 6, 2011 until May 2, 2011. The show was primarily filmed in New York City, New York. It was executively produced by Mona Scott-Young for Monami Entertainment, Toby Barraud and Stefan Springman for NFGTV, Kenny Hull for Interloc Films, and Jim Ackerman and Jeff Olde for VH1. 

The series chronicles the lives of several women and men in the New York area, involved in hip hop music. It consists of 9 episodes, including a reunion special hosted by Angie Martinez.

Production
The series was first mentioned in VH1's programming development report in early 2010 as Diary of a Hip Hop Girlfriend. On January 4, 2011, VH1 announced that Love & Hip Hop would make its series premiere on March 6, 2011, as an eight episode series. The first season was later expanded to nine episodes to include the first season reunion, which aired on May 16, 2011. The series would star Jim Jones' girlfriend Chrissy Lampkin, Fabolous's girlfriend Emily Bustamante, Olivia Longott and aspiring rapper Somaya Reece, with Jim Jones, his mother Nancy Jones, Somaya's manager Maurice Aguilar and Olivia's manager Rich Dollaz in supporting roles. Swiss Beatz's ex-wife Mashonda would appear in a minor supporting role.

The season was released on DVD in region 1 on June 26, 2012.

Synopsis

Chrissy has been with rapper Jim Jones for six years but she is struggling to take their relationship to the next level. Emily has been with rapper Fabolous for eight years and has a son by him, however, he still refuses to claim her in public as anything but his stylist. Olivia is a R&B singer desperate to get back in the limelight after a series of career misfires. Somaya is a Latina rapper who has recently arrived in New York City, hungry to kickstart her music career. 

When Somaya pursues Jim to collaborate on a track, she ignites a feud with Chrissy. The two get into a huge argument at a yacht party. When Somaya's manager Maurice makes reference to Jim's alleged money issues during the fight, Jim comes after him on the streets of New York. Blaming Olivia for the entire fiasco, Somaya puts her on blast in an online interview, angering Olivia's manager Rich. Meanwhile, under the advice of Mashonda, whose ex-husband Swiss Beatz famously left for Alicia Keys, Emily contemplates leaving Fab for good. Chrissy takes matters into her own hands and proposes to Jim, provoking a violent meltdown from his mother Nancy.

Reception
Jon Caramanica of The New York Times praised the show's deconstruction of the public image of rappers, as well as the quality of the production values with "slick, beautiful shots of the women driving spectacular cars with no men in sight". However, he was critical of the "needless filler drama" between Lampkin and Reese, a criticism that was shared by other critics who felt the "endless catty arguments and trashy behavior" detracted from the show's message and was too derivative of The Real Housewives franchise.

Cast

Starring

 Chrissy Lampkin (9 episodes)
 Emily Bustamante (9 episodes)
 Olivia Longott (9 episodes)
 Somaya Reece (8 episodes)

Also starring

 Jim Jones (8 episodes)
 Mashonda (3 episodes)
 Maurice Aguilar (6 episodes)
 Nancy "Mama" Jones (5 episodes)
 Rich Dollaz (7 episodes)

Producer Cite On The Beat appears in several episodes as a guest star. The show also features minor appearances from notable figures within the hip hop industry and New York's social scene, including Darrelle Revis of the New York Jets, photographer Felix Natal Jr., Dipset members Freekey Zekey and Juelz Santana, Mama Jones' friend Freddie Robinson Jr., Somaya's ex-boyfriend X.O., producer K-Mack, music video director Rage, vlogger DJ Vlad and Emily's children Taina and Johan.

Yandy Smith appears briefly in the background of Chrissy's proposal party, she would go on to appear in a larger role in season two. The season's opening monologue includes archival clips from various hip-hop videos, such as 50 Cent's "Candy Shop" and Fabolous' "Baby Don't Go", which features appearances from future Love & Hip Hop: Atlanta and Love & Hip Hop: Miami cast members Lil Scrappy and Shay Johnson.

Episodes

Webisodes

Bonus scenes
Deleted and extended scenes from the season's episodes were released weekly as bonus content on VH1's official website. 

Two scenes feature Chrissy's personal trainer Scott, who appears in green screen segments like the other supporting cast members, suggesting he originally had a larger role on the show but it never made it to air.

Music
Several cast members had their music featured on the show and released singles to coincide with the airing of the episodes.

References

External links

2011 American television seasons
Love & Hip Hop